Chick lit is a term used to describe a type of popular fiction targeted at younger women. Widely used in the 1990s and 2000s, the term has fallen out of fashion with publishers while writers and critics have rejected its inherent sexism. Novels identified as chick lit typically address romantic relationships, female friendships, and workplace struggles in humorous and lighthearted ways. Typical protagonists are urban, heterosexual women in their late twenties and early thirties: the 1990s chick lit heroine represented an evolution of the traditional romantic heroine in her assertiveness, financial independence and enthusiasm for conspicuous consumption.

The format developed through the early 1990s  on both sides of the Atlantic with books such as Terry McMillan's Waiting to Exhale (1992, US) and Catherine Alliott's The Old Girl Network (1994, UK). Helen Fielding's Bridget Jones's Diary (1996, UK), wildly popular globally, is the "ur text" of chick lit, while Candace Bushnell's (US) 1997 novel Sex and the City has huge ongoing cultural influence. By the late 1990s, chick lit titles regularly topped bestseller lists, and many imprints were created devoted entirely to chick lit. By the mid-2000s, commentators noted that the chick lit market was increasingly saturated, and by the early 2010s, publishers had largely abandoned the category. The term "chick lit" maintains an afterlife as a popular category for readers and amateur writers on the Internet.

Origins of the term

 
 
In 1992, Los Angeles Times critic Carolyn See was probably the first to spot that a new style of popular women's fiction was emerging. Though she didn't use the term chick lit, in a review of Terry McMillan's Waiting to Exhale, the critic noted that McMillan's book was not "lofty" or "luminous" but was likely to be highly commercially successful. Carolyn See wrote, "McMillan’s new work is part of another genre entirely, so new it doesn’t really have a name yet. This genre has to do with women, triumph, revenge, comradeship."

Chick lit did not become an established term for a style of novel until the second half of the 1990s. "Chick" is American slang for a young woman, and "lit" is a shortened form of the word "literature." There was probably no single origin of the term: Princeton University students were reported in 1988 to use chick lit as slang for a course on women's writing and, in the UK, Oxford Reference report that the term arose as a "flippant counterpart" to the term "lad lit". The parallel term used for movies, chick flick, enjoyed slightly earlier uptake (chick flick is said to have been coined after the 1993 film Sleepless in Seattle in which a male character discusses "chicks' movie[s]"). In what was probably one of its first major outings, the term chick lit was deployed ironically: a 1995 anthology edited by Cris Mazza and Jeffrey DeShell entitled  Chick Lit: Postfeminist Fiction contained 22 short fiction pieces in response to Mazza and DeShell's call for "postfeminist writing". Early use of the term was heavily associated with journalism (both Bridget Jones Diary and Sex in the City began as newspaper columns) and James Wolcott's 1996 article in The New Yorker, "Hear Me Purr," co-opted the term chick lit to proscribe what he called the trend of "girlishness" evident in the writing of female newspaper columnists at that time.

In the early years, there was some variation on the exact term used: in 2000, the Sydney Morning Herald reported the birth of a "publishing phenomenon" that can be called "chick fiction."

At the peak of the term's popularity, a slew of related sub-genres were proposed with similar names: sistah lit (targeted at Black readers), chick lit jr (for young readers), mommy lit, and chick lit in corsets (historical fiction, and a term only found in one academic paper). The relationship with the term lad lit is more complicated; lad lit arose before or in parallel with chick lit. Of these parallel terms, mommy lit, and lad lit are the only terms to have enjoyed any significant uptake - and that a tiny fraction of the use of the primary term chick lit.

Writers and critics
Controversy over chick lit focused at first on the literary value of books identified or promoted as part of the genre. Over time, controversy has focused more on the term itself, and whether the concept of a chick lit genre is inherently sexist.

In 1998, reviewer Alex Kuczynski, writing for The New York Times, condemned Fielding's novel in particular, writing: "Bridget is such a sorry spectacle, wallowing in her man-crazed helplessness, that her foolishness cannot be excused." In 2001, writer Doris Lessing deemed the genre "instantly forgettable" while Beryl Bainbridge called the genre "a froth sort of thing". Author Jenny Colgan immediately fired back at Lessing and Bainbridge, explaining why, for a new generation of women, chick lit was an important development:

Two years later Colgan had turned strongly against the term chick lit, being the first to state what is now a mainstream position among writers of women's popular fiction: she rejected the term chick lit while defending the cultural value of her work. She observed, "Chick-lit is a deliberately condescending term they use to rubbish us all. If they called it slut-lit it couldn't be any more insulting." Much of the debate at this time was between different generations of women writers: for example, Maureen Dowd (b.1952) described the younger women's work as "all chick and no lit," while Colgan (b.1972) derided the older, female critics of chick lit as "hairy-leggers." There was a "troubling" lack of solidarity.

In 2005, debate continued with the publication of editor Elizabeth Merrick's anthology of women's fiction, This Is Not Chick Lit (2005), where Merrick argued in her introduction that "Chick lit's formula numbs our senses." In response, self-identifying chick-lit author Lauren Baratz-Logsted published her own anthology of stories This Is Chick Lit whose project was "born out of anger" and aimed to prove that chick lit was not all "Manolos and cosmos, and cookie-cutter books about women juggling relationships and careers in the new millennium," but rather that the genre deals with "friendship and laughter, love and death - i.e. the stuff of life."

In 2007, Diane Shipley came to the genre's defence, arguing that chick lit books increasingly covered serious topics but, anyway, "I just don't see what's morally or intellectually wrong with reading a book you enjoy and relate to, that might not draw deep conclusions about the future of humanity but might cheer you up after a bad day, or see you through your own health problems."

However, in general through the late 2000s and 2010s writers of women's popular fiction increasingly distanced themselves from the term chick lit, while arguing that blanket critical dismissals of their work were rooted in sexism. For example, in a 2010 Guardian article, humor writer DJ Connell leads with changing her writing name from Diane to DJ to avoid the chick lit label. Sophie Kinsella and Marian Keyes, two authors who have enjoyed huge success through and beyond the chick lit era, both now reject the term. Kinsella refers to her own work as "romantic comedy". Keyes said of the term in 2014,

At an event at the Edinburgh Book Festival in August 2020, Keyes again rejected the term chick lit as dismissive and sexist, as popular fiction written by men is not described as "dick lit".

Publishers 
In 2000, Sydney Morning Herald described the "publishing phenomenon" of what it called "chicfic," books with "Covers [that] are candy-bright, heavy in pink and fluorescence. The titles are also candy-bright, hinting at easy digestion and a good laugh... ...Such books are positioned in a marketplace as hybrids of the magazine article, fictional or fictionalised, television...and comfort food digestible over a single night at home."

Through the 2000s publishers continue to push the subgenre because sales continue to be high. In 2003, Publishers Weekly reported on numerous new chick lit imprints, such as, "Kensington's Strapless, which launched in April 2003 and has one book a month scheduled through the end of 2004. Kensington editorial director John Scognamiglio explained that the imprint was created in response to requests from salespeople for a chick lit brand." Nonetheless, the same Publishers Weekly article was already looking back enviously at the massive sales achieved by Bridget Jones's Diary in 1998 and commenting on the challenges for chick lit publishers in a now-overcrowded market. Already, Publishers Weekly suggested, chick lit was - if not in decline - at least at a turning point.

In 2008, editor Sara Nelson stated that the definition of what's considered to be within the genre of chick lit has become more accomplished and "grown up".

By 2012 news sources were reporting the death of chick lit. Salon.com reported that "Because chick lit (whatever it is - or was) provoked so many ideologically fraught arguments about the values placed on women's vs. men's tastes, high- vs. lowbrow culture, comedy vs. drama and so on, it's tempting to read particular significance into its decline," but went on to argue that the decline was due to a normal process of changing fashion and taste in genre fiction.

Chick lit globally
Though chick lit originated in the UK and U.S., it rapidly became a global publishing phenomenon - and indeed may have been one of the first truly global publishing trends.

India

In India, Rajashree's Trust Me was the biggest-selling Indian chick lit novel. The popularity of novels like Trust Me, Swati Kaushal's Piece of Cake  can be seen in the context of the rise of regional varieties of chick lit. In an interview with the New York Times, Helen Fielding said, "I think it had far more to do with zeitgeist than imitation." If the chick lit explosion has "led to great new female writers emerging from Eastern Europe and India, then it's worth any number of feeble bandwagon jumpers." Sunaina Kumar wrote in the Indian Express, "Ten years after the publication of Bridget Jones's Diary, the genre of fiction most recognisable for its pink cover art of stilettos, martini glasses and lipsticks, is now being colourfully infused with bindis, saris, and bangles." Indian chick lit is sometimes referred to as 'ladki-lit'.

Brazil
In Brazil, chick lit in translation is categorised as "Literatura de mulherzinha." -inha is the Portuguese diminutive form, so this means, literally, "little-women's literature." One Brazilian commentator notes, "The diminutive is not by accident. Just as its not by accident that the covers of books by women writers are usually, stereotypically feminine. With covers that suggest a light and romantic, commercial plot.. ....books by female authors arrive to the a reader with a series of biases which ensure that these authors remain on the cultural bottom rung."

Chick lit online
The development and decline of chick lit as a publishing phenomenon coincided with an explosion in internet usage in the developed world. The academic Sandra Folie argues that "Fans and their websites or blogs, online presences of newspapers, magazines, or publishing houses, and also the free encyclopedia Wikipedia" played a key part in defining and shaping the concept of a chick lit genre. Folie discusses the British site chicklit.co.uk which was online from 2002-2014 and included information no just on books and authors but also lifestyle issues for young women. The American Chicklitbooks.com was online from 2003 to 2013 discussing, "Hip, bright literature for today’s modern woman." As chick lit declined as a publishing category fans online created their own response: in 2012 a website called chicklitisnotdead.com was reported to have 25,000 users. In 2022 an active chick lit community group on the goodreads.com site had 4,756 members.

See also
 Chick flick
 Feminism
 Fratire
 Lad lit
 Women's literature

References

Further reading
 
Roy, Pinaki. "The Chick Factor: A Brief Survey of the Indian Chick-lit Novels", The Postcolonial Woman Question: Readings in Indian Women Novelists in English. Eds. Ray, G.N. and J. Sarkar. Kolkata: Books Way, 2011. pp. 213–23.

External links
"Chick lit, for better or worse, is here to stay"
"Collection Development 'Chick Lit': Hip Lit for Hip Chicks" Library Journal Article on the genre
"India's Cheeky 'Chick Lit' Finds an Audience"

 
Women's fiction
Literary genres